In Roman mythology, Lua was a goddess to whom soldiers sacrificed captured weapons of enemy combatants. She is sometimes referred to as "Lua Mater" or "Lua Saturni", the latter of which makes her a consort of Saturn.  It may be that Lua was merely an alternative name for Ops.

References

Roman goddesses
War goddesses